The 1989–1992 Afghan Civil War took place between the Soviet withdrawal from Afghanistan on 15 February 1989 until 27 April 1992, the day after the proclamation of the Peshawar Accords proclaiming a new interim Afghan government which was supposed to start serving on 28 April 1992.

Mujahideen groups, some of them more or less united in the Islamic Unity of Afghanistan Mujahideen, in the years 1989–1992 proclaimed as their conviction that they were battling the hostile "puppet regime" of the Republic of Afghanistan in Kabul. In March 1989, the mujahideen groups Hezb-e Islami Gulbuddin and Ittehad-e Islami in cooperation with the Pakistani Inter-Services Intelligence (ISI) attacked Jalalabad but they were defeated by June.

In March 1991, a mujahideen coalition quickly conquered the city of Khost. In March 1992, having lost the last remnants of Soviet support, President Mohammad Najibullah agreed to step aside and make way for a mujahideen coalition government. One mujahideen group, Hezb-e Islami Gulbuddin, refused to confer and discuss a coalition government under the Pakistani sponsored Peshawar Peace Accords and invaded Kabul. This kicked off a civil war, starting 25 April 1992, between initially three, but within weeks five or six mujahideen groups or armies.

Background (1978–89) 

In October 1978, opponents of the reforms of the People's Democratic Party of Afghanistan (PDPA) government, including modernizing traditional Islamic civil and marriage laws, changing the national flag to a Soviet-style red flag, and forcing land reform, started a revolt, and called themselves 'mujahideen'.

The Soviet Union, that had been supporting Afghanistan economically and militarily since 1919 (see Soviet–Afghan War#Soviet–Afghan relations post-1920s) and early 1979 had sent hundreds of military and civilian advisers into Afghanistan after a request from President Nur Muhammad Taraki, in December 1979 invaded Afghanistan with its 40th Army, around 75,000 strong, killed the new President Hafizullah Amin, and installed Soviet loyalist Babrak Karmal as president of a Soviet-organised and –backed PDPA-regime.

In spite of a UN General Assembly resolution condemning the 1979 USSR invasion and the Organisation of Islamic Cooperation demanding immediate Soviet withdrawal, the Russians stayed until early 1989. They managed to take control of major cities and strategic installations, thus acerbating nationalistic feelings among rebels who drew Soviet troops into war with urban uprisings and tribal armies. The Soviets leveled villages, destroyed irrigation ditches and laid millions of mines in an attempt to root out the mujahideen rebels.

The new Soviet leader Mikhail Gorbachev, taking charge in 1985, pressured by the People's Republic of China, in 1987 announced his intention to withdraw from Afghanistan, which withdrawal took place between May 1988 and February 1989.

The mujahideen resistance movement had started chaotically in 1978 and had always stayed highly segmented along regional, ethnic, tribal and religious lines: after four years the mujahideen operated from an estimated 4,000 bases, a typical commander leading a few hundred men. In 1985, seven larger Sunni Islamic rebel groups had coordinated their fight against the Soviets, who were also known as the Pakistani backed Peshawar 7 Mujahideen Alliance. After the Soviets had left Afghanistan in February 1989, the still segmented mujahideen continued their fight against the PDPA-government of President Mohammad Najibullah, who was still massively supported by the Soviet Union and therefore still considered to lead a hostile "puppet regime".

Attacks between mujahideen groups (1987–89) 

According to published reports during the 1980s, Gulbuddin Hekmatyar's Hezb-e Islami Gulbuddin developed a reputation for attacking other resistance forces, especially those of Ahmad Shah Massoud, and raiding or blocking their food and arms supplies as well as caravans of relief organizations. According to author Steve Coll, Hekmatyar attacked Ahmad Shah Massoud so often that Washington (who was supporting him through Pakistan) "feared he might be a secret KGB plant whose mission was to sow disruption within the anti-communist resistance." Reports suggest that Hekmatyar's commanders were saving their men and weapons to establish Hezb-e Islami Gulbuddin as the dominant organization once the Soviets departed.

In 1989, Hekmatyar's forces once again conducted an attack on forces of Ahmad Shah Massoud, this time targeting Massoud and the senior leadership of Shura-e Nazar – Massoud's military and political alliance of 130 northern commanders. While they were not able to kill or injure Massoud, Hekmatyar's forces tortured to death 30 of Massoud's men, some of whom were close friends of Massoud. Survivors describe the torture as pulling their eyes out, cutting their ears and noses off, and cutting their stomachs open. Massoud consequently ordered an operation to hunt down the murderers. Shura-e Nazar were able to capture the assassins, but instead of revenge killings, Massoud sent them to Peshawar to have them tried before a court. The courts sentenced them to death.

Ahmad Shah Massoud for the sake of Afghan unity declared: "My message to Hekmatyar's people is that without a united front we cannot succeed, we cannot achieve anything in Afghanistan." Roy Gutman of the United States Institute of Peace considered Massoud "the only Afghan leader with an integrated vision".

Through this period (1987–89) both Massoud and Hekmatyar had been frequently fighting each other and killing each other's officers, and Massoud's rhetoric was rarely matched by action. In 1988, for instance, Massoud's forces attacked Hekmatyar loyalists in Badakhshan Province. In 1989 Massoud arrested and executed one of Hekmatyar's local officers, Jamal Agha, whom he accused of having murdered a number of Jamiat-e-Islami commandants: Mohammad Izzatullah, Mohammad Islamuddin, Mulla Abdul-Wadoud, and Payinda Mohammad.

However, Hekmatyar's supporters accused Massoud of having killed these commandants to centralize his authority in Jamaat's ranks and framed Jamal, whom they claimed had good relations with the victims. This was stated by Hezb-e Islami Gulbuddin supporter Mohammad Tanwir Halim in his book published in 2013. However, this version of the story is uncorroborated and Hekmatyar was widely unpopular in any case for his vicious murders, though this was not necessarily true of his commanders some of whom like Abdul-Rauf Safi, Abdul-Sabour Farid and perhaps Jamal enjoyed decent relations with other groups. Massoud later appointed Abdul-Rauf Safi as Kabul commandant. Hekmatyar's supporters also accused Massoud of treachery because of his ceasefires with Russian forces and in this they had the support of Jamaat leader Mohammad Eshaq who also criticized Massoud for his ceasefire with the Russians during the second half of the occupation. It appears that Massoud was trying to form a base independent of Pakistan, and in this endeavour he did make deals with governments traditionally hostile to the mujahideen, including India and Russia. During the 1990s Massoud would corroborate with Russia in his conflict against Taliban forces. Hekmatyar exploited this to attack Massoud, whom he called the "ruler of the Panjshir" and a traitor.

However, accusations of treachery by both sides seem far-fetched. The Pakistani coordinator, Mohammed Yousaf, does not challenge Massoud's version of Jamal story despite Pakistan's hostility towards Massoud, and in any case it has become a fait accompli. Similarly, Palestinian mujahideen leader Abdullah Azzam claimed that Massoud was a legendary fighter, though Azzam notably rarely criticized any mujahideen leaders to avoid friction.

Main participants

Republic of Afghanistan

PDPA/DRA government 
After the Soviet withdrawal on 15 February 1989, the government of President Mohammad Najibullah and his People's Democratic Party of Afghanistan (PDPA) was on its own. The U.S. intelligence agencies expected the regime to collapse within three to six months.

However, this estimation did not take into account several assets available to the Democratic Republic of Afghanistan (DRA) government. The first of these was the large quantities of military hardware donated by the Soviet Union. In 1989, the army and pro-government militias still had 1568 tanks, 828 armoured personnel carriers, 4880 artillery pieces, 126 modern fighter-bombers and 14 attack helicopters. Also, the DRA continued to receive massive aid from the Soviet Union, valued between two and six billion dollars a year, and Soviet military advisors were still present in Afghanistan. The government forces also came to rely on the use of large quantities of Scud missiles: between 1988 and 1992 more than 2000 of these were fired inside Afghanistan, the largest amount of ballistic missiles used since World War II. This considerable amount of firepower was sufficient to keep the mujahideen at bay.

Abdul Rashid Dostum (Jowzjani militia) 
Abdul Rashid Dostum's Jowzjani militia, officially called the 53rd Infantry Division, was the most effective pro-government (DRA) militia. Numbering 40,000 men drawn from the Uzbek minority, it took its orders directly from Najibullah, who used it as a strategic reserve. After 1989, this force was the only one capable of carrying out offensive operations.

Mujahideen

Ahmad Shah Massoud (Jamiat-e Islami) 
The U.S. provided Ahmad Shah Massoud with close to no support despite The Wall Street Journal calling him "the Afghan who won the cold war" and was primarily responsible for the mujahideen victory. Massoud instead did get support from the United Kingdom specifically MI6 and direct support with the SAS. Part of the reason why he still got only minor support was that the U.S. permitted its funding and arms distribution to be administered by Pakistan which favored Gulbuddin Hekmatyar who considered himself the archenemy of Massoud. Massoud was also seen as "too independent". Primary advocates for still supporting Massoud instead were State Department's Edmund McWilliams and Peter Tomsen, who were on the ground in Afghanistan and Pakistan. Others included two Heritage Foundation neoconservative foreign policy analysts, Michael Johns and James A. Phillips, both of whom championed Massoud as the Afghan resistance leader most worthy of U.S. support under the Reagan Doctrine.

Gulbuddin Hekmatyar (Hezb-e Islami Gulbuddin) 
During the anti-Soviet war (1979–89), the United States had allowed Pakistan to funnel much American military aid to Gulbuddin Hekmatyar's party Hezb-e Islami Gulbuddin.
The U.S. permitted its funding and arms distribution to be administered by Pakistan, which favored Gulbuddin Hekmatyar.

According to the U.S. Special Envoy to Afghanistan in 1989–1992, Peter Tomsen, Gulbuddin Hekmatyar was hired in 1990 by the Pakistani Inter-Services Intelligence (ISI) to conquer and rule Afghanistan in the benefit of Pakistani interests, which plan was delayed until 1992 as a result of US pressure to cancel it.

Abdul Rasul Sayyaf (Ittehad-e Islami) 
One of the beneficiaries of Saudi Arabian support, especially financial, was Abdul Rasul Sayyaf and his army Islamic Union for the Liberation of Afghanistan, also called Ittehad-e Islami.

Jalaluddin Haqqani (Haqqani network) 
Another beneficiary of Saudi Arabian support, especially financial, was Jalaluddin Haqqani who had had strong contacts to Arab fighters in the war against the Soviets.

Battle of Jalalabad (1989) 

In the spring of 1989, the Seven-Party (Afghanistan mujahideen) Union in Peshawar supported by the Pakistani intelligence agency ISI attacked Jalalabad. The ISI's Director Gul wanted to see a mujahideen government over Afghanistan, led by Hekmatyar.

Analysts disagree as to whether Pakistan's Prime Minister Benazir Bhutto was totally kept in the dark about the ISI's plan to overturn Afghanistan or was one of the instigators of this attack. One analyst stated that also United States Ambassador to Pakistan Robert B. Oakley was exhortating this mujahideen attack. The Americans reportedly were motivated by their wish to humiliate the Marxists and send them out of Afghanistan "clinging to their helicopters", thus avenge the fall of South Vietnam; Pakistan wished to retaliate against the Soviet Union as the latter had long unconditionally supported Pakistan's regional rival, India.

Battle begins 

Involved in the operation were forces of Hekmatyar's Hezb-e Islami Gulbuddin, Abdul Rasul Sayyaf's Ittehad-e Islami and Arab fighters, totalling 10,000 men. The attack began on March 5, 1989, and went well at first for the mujahideen, who captured the Jalalabad airfield before being counterattacked. When government troops started to surrender, however, they, along with unarmed civilians, were tortured and executed by Hekmatyar's and Sayyaf's forces, making the option of surrender impossible for the communists who then fought harder. Consequently, the attacking forces were soon blocked by the main Afghan army positions held by the 11th Division, that were protected by bunkers, barbed wire and minefields. The government troops could count on intensive air support, as the Afghan air force flew 20 sorties a day over the battlefield. An-12 transport aircraft, modified to carry bombs, flew at high altitude out of range of the Stinger missiles used by the mujahideen; cluster bombs were used intensively.

Three Scud firing batteries, deployed around Kabul, fired more than 400 missiles in support of the Jalalabad garrison. Despite their imprecision, these weapons had a severe effect on the morale of the mujahideen, who could do nothing to prevent them.
By the middle of May, they had made no headway against the defences of Jalalabad, and were running low on ammunition. In July, they were unable to prevent the Afghan Army from recapturing Samarkhel, and Jalalabad was still firmly in the hands of Najibullah's government. The mujahideen suffered an estimated 3,000 casualties during this battle. An estimated 12,000–15,000 civilians were killed, while 10,000 had fled the fighting.

Aftermath 

Contrary to American and Pakistani expectations, this battle proved that the Afghan Army could fight without Soviet help, and greatly increased the confidence of government supporters. Conversely, the morale of the mujahideen involved in the attack slumped and many local commanders of Hekmatyar and Sayyaf concluded truces with the government. In the words of Brigadier-General Mohammed Yousaf, an officer of the ISI, "the jihad never recovered from Jalalabad". In particular of course Pakistan's plans to promote Hekmatyar were also harmed. Both the Pakistani and the American governments were frustrated with the outcome. As a result of this failure, General Hamid Gul was immediately sacked by Pakistani Prime Minister Benazir Bhutto, and replaced with General Shamsur Rahman Kallu as the Director-General of the ISI. Kallu pursued a more classical policy of support to the Afghan guerillas. In this respect he cut off the barrier that his predecessors, Akhtar Abdur Rahman and Gul had placed between the mujahideen and the American secret service, which for the first time had direct access to the mujahedeen. The former Pakistani spies, such as Gul, had argued that this gave the United States an opportunity to both undercut Pakistan's interests as well as to weave discord among the mujahideen (something which Pakistan's promotion of Hekmatyar had of course done as well).

Indeed, with direct American access to the mujahideen – in particular that of the envoy Peter Tomsen, whose attitude towards independent Afghans was arrogant and arguably hostile in that he deemed them dangerous extremists without direct US supervision – any segment of mujahideen unity crumbled. Traditionally independent mujahideen leaders, such as Yunus Khalis, Jalaluddin Haqqani, who had tried to unite the mujahideen rivals Massoud and Hekmatyar, now moved closer towards Pakistan because of their suspicion of the United States' intentions. (See also Haqqani network). Others, like Abdul Haq and Massoud, instead favoured the United States because of their tense relations with Pakistan. While Abdul Haq remained hostile towards the communist government and its militias, Massoud would go on to make controversial alliances with former communist figures. Massoud claimed that this was an attempt to unite Afghanistan, but his enemies such as Hekmatyar attacked him for this. Hekmatyar's push were also supported by Pakistan, so that by 1990 there was a definite (if loose) pair of competing axes – one promoted by Pakistan and including Hekmatyar, but also other mujahidin leaders such as Khalis, Jalaluddin Haqqani and other mujahideen leaders who were unsympathetic to Hekmatyar – and the other promoted by the United States and led by Massoud, but also including other leaders such as Abdul Haq who were unsympathetic to Massoud.

The government forces further proved their worth in April 1990, during an offensive against a fortified complex at Paghman. After a heavy bombardment and an assault that lasted until the end of June, the Afghan Army, spearheaded by Dostum's militia, was able to clear the mujahideen entrenchments.

Domestic criticism 

The Jalalabad operation was seen as a grave mistake by some mujahideen leaders such as Ahmad Shah Massoud and Abdul Haq, who did not believe the mujahideen had the capacity to capture a major city in conventional warfare. Neither Massoud nor Haq had participated in the attack on Jalalabad. Massoud even said it was by BBC radio that he learned about the operation. Haq advocated the pursuit of coordinated guerilla warfare, that would gradually weaken the communist regime and cause its collapse through internal divisions. Abdul Haq was also quoted as asking: "How is that we Afghans, who never lost a war, must take military instructions from the Pakistanis, who never won one?" Ahmad Shah Massoud criticized the go-it-alone attitude of Pakistan and their Afghan followers stating: "The damage caused by our (Mujahideen forces) lack of a unified command is obvious. There is a total lack of coordination, which means we are not launching simultaneous offensives on different fronts. As a result, the government can concentrate its resources and pick us off one by one. And that is what has happened at Jalalabad."

Enmity Jamiat-e Islami vs Hezb-e Islami Gulbuddin 
In June 1990, battles between Ahmad Shah Massoud's Jamiat-e Islami and Gulbuddin Hekmatyar's Hezb-e Islami Gulbuddin in Logar and Parwan caused hundreds of casualties on each side.

Mujahideen's conquest of Khost (1991) 

In two weeks' time (14–31 March 1991), mujahideen forces conquered the city of Khost in eastern Afghanistan on the Kabul DRA Government. The battle was organized by the National Commanders' Shura (NCS) led by Jalaluddin Haqqani and with representatives from all parties of the Seven-Party (mujahideen) Union, including Gulbuddin Hekmatyar and Abdul Rasul Sayyaf. One reason why the mujahideen succeeded here, was that once the Soviet Army had left the country, supplying the Government forces in Khost through the air had become too difficult. When the Government's garrison had run out of supplies, the DRA troops massively surrendered to the mujahidin.

After an eleven-year siege, Khost fell to Jalaluddin Haqqani's troops, that were in east Afghanistan, on April 11, 1991, following a negotiated surrender of the communist garrison. This was a coordinated effort where the final push came in an assault with Ibrahim Haqqani acting as stand-in for Jalaluddin, who had been abroad at the time to raise funds and links. The commandant Gul Aqa was captured. It was claimed that much of the garrison had switched sides because the mujahidin fighters were offering amnesty and lenient treatment, partly an indication of Haqqani's skilful diplomacy. There was considerable irritation by Haqqani's forces when some Pakistani outlets claimed that Hekmatyar had acted as leader, in spite of the similarly close relationship between Haqqani and Pakistani soldiers. At this time Pakistan were strongly in favour of Hekmatyar, who would be their primary proxy until 1994 when they switched to Taliban movement. However, the veteran Pakistani reporter Rahimulah Yusufzai confirmed that it had been a coordinated effort with Jalaluddin Haqqani as overall leader. Haqqani also offered to mediate between the bitter opponents Massoud and Hekmatyar, though this came to nought.

Najibullah government weakens (March 1990–January 1992)

Internal dissensions
Despite its military successes, the communist regime of President Mohammad Najibullah was still plagued by its traditional internal divisions, namely the opposition between the Khalq and Parcham factions.

The DRA defense minister, Shahnawaz Tanai, disagreed with Najibullah's policy of National Reconciliation with the mujahideen. Also he had become convinced that his Khalq faction was losing its share of power in favour of Najibullah's Parcham. For these reasons he entered in secret negotiations with Gulbuddin Hekmatyar, and plotted against Najibullah. Launched on 6 March 1990, his coup failed, despite almost killing Najibullah, and Tanai was forced to flee to Pakistan, where he joined Hekmatyar. A severe repression followed, as Najibullah ordered the army to be purged of Tanai's supporters. In the ensuing fighting, several airports were bombarded, damaging 46 military aircraft. This episode reinforced Najibullah's suspicions and led him to govern through his personal allies rather than the government apparatus, further deepening the rift between Khalqis and Parchamis.

Economic crisis
By 1992, Afghanistan was in dire straits. Reserves of natural gas, Afghanistan's only export, had dried out since 1989, rendering the country completely dependent on Soviet aid. This amounted to 230,000 tons of food per year, but by 1991, the Soviet economy was itself faltering, preventing the Soviets from fulfilling their commitments.

In August 1991, following his arrival in power, Boris Yeltsin announced that all direct assistance to Najibullah's regime would be curtailed. In January 1992, the Afghan Air Force, which had proved vital to the survival of the regime, could no longer fly any aircraft for lack of fuel. The army was debilitated by food shortages, causing the desertion rate to rise by 60 percent between 1990 and 1991.

The pro-government militias that had grown to replace the army in many of its assignments, were faithful to the regime only so long as it could deliver enough weapons to enable them to conserve their power. With the end of the Soviet aid, the government could no longer satisfy these demands, and the loyalty of the militias began to waver.

Finally, after negotiations between communist General Abdul Rashid Dostum and Ahmad Shah Massoud, the Junbish militia defected to the mujahideen. This reversal of fortunes effectively turned the tables in favor of the resistance, and forced Najibullah to resign.

Najibullah waning, mujahideen pursue coalition (March 1992) 

The Soviet Union having dissolved in late 1991 and Russia having decided to end fuel shipments to Afghanistan, by 1992 the Afghan regime of President Mohammad Najibullah began to collapse.

On 18 March 1992, Najibullah announced his willingness to resign in order to make way for a neutral interim government. This step made him lose internal control; his government broke into several factions.
General Abdul Rashid Dostum of the Afghan National Army defected the next day, allied with Hezb-i Wahdat and Jamiat-e Islami mujahideen forces, and took control of Mazar-i-Sharif.

At some point, the UN and senior leaders of several Afghan mujahideen (= Islamic resistance) parties decided to meet in Peshawar, Pakistan, to try to form a new national Afghan coalition government. Gulbuddin Hekmatyar, another mujahideen warlord in Afghanistan, supported by the United States and Pakistan during the Soviet–Afghan War (1979–89) and presumably hired by Pakistan's ISI to conquer Afghanistan (see section Participants civil war 1989–92), soon opposed to such an endeavour, planning to capture Kabul alone. In a recorded radio conversation, mujahideen leader Ahmad Shah Massoud invited Hekmatyar to come to the negotiations, but Hekmatyar replied: "We will march into Kabul with our naked sword. No one can stop us. ... Why should we meet the leaders?"

Armies creep up to Kabul (1–14 April) 

On 10 April 1992, the UN presented a plan to the mujahideen parties—of which they approved—to form a pre-interim council on 15 April to accept formal sovereignty from President Mohammad Najibullah. The plan was for the UN to fly that pre-interim council of community and tribal leaders into Kabul on 15 April and then fly Najibullah out of Kabul and out of Afghanistan. Throughout the process, mujahideen forces would remain outside Kabul.

But on 14 April, Ahmad Shah Massoud with his Jamiat-e Islami forces had conquered parts of Parwan Province just north of Kabul and had approximately 20,000 troops stationed around Kabul.
By mid-April, Massoud's forces (Jamiat) along with forces of Abdul Rashid Dostum (Junbish-e Melli-ye Islami),  Harakat, and some Ismaili troops led by Sayyid Mansor took control of Bagram airbase, 70 km north of Kabul.

Gulbuddin Hekmatyar with his Hezb-e Islami Gulbuddin troops moved up to the southern limits of Kabul.  Defecting government forces chose sides with those three mujahideen parties: Jamiat-e Islami, Junbish-e Melli-ye Islami and Hezb-e Islami Gulbuddin, offering them their support in case they'd decide to enter Kabul.

Hezb-e Islami Gulbuddin invades Kabul (15–23 April) 

On 15 April 1992, President Mohammad Najibullah was ready to fulfill his role in the plan of 10 April (see above), but the mujahideen parties weren't any longer: some of them now objected against that 10 April agreement. The UN on 15 April did not, as scheduled, fly a pre-interim council into Kabul; apparently, negotiations in Pakistan over such a council were still dragging.

On 16 April, Najibullah was toppled by a coalition of four top generals, who expressed their support for a UN mediated peace plan but also invited mujahideen leader Ahmad Shah Massoud to enter Kabul as new head of state right away, a proposal which Massoud, committed and faithful to those UN and mujahideen coalition negotiations in Peshawar (see above), declined. One of the putschists, Deputy Defense Minister Mohammad Nabi Azimi, appeared on Afghanistan National Television, saying: "I assure my countrymen that we will have peace in the very near future. There is no need for war anymore". By 17 April 1992, troops of Abdul Rashid Dostum controlled Kabul International Airport.
Gulbuddin Hekmatyar on 17 April had moved close to Kabul and threatened to attack the city "if the present administration fails to transfer power to the mujahideen".
Not much later, Pashtun government officials started to allow Hekmatyar's Hezb-e Islami Gulbuddin forces into Kabul.

Militias fight in Kabul (24–27 April) 
By 24 April 1992, Gulbuddin Hekmatyar, leader of Hezb-e Islami Gulbuddin, seemed on the verge of taking control of Kabul, which prompted Ahmad Shah Massoud's and  Abdul Rashid Dostum's forces to also enter the town, to prevent the establishment of a Hekmatyar dictatorship.

On 25 April, Hekmatyar with Khalqi allies attempted to overtake Kabul. But Massoud's and Dostum's forces were stronger and forced Hekmatyar with hard fighting out of Kabul by 27 April. Hastily now, the mujahideen parties discussing in Peshawar (Pakistan) -- which did not include Hekmatyar's Hezb-e Islami Gulbuddin—agreed on their Peshawar Accords which they announced on 26 April, proclaiming a leadership council assuring residual powers for the party leaders under an interim President Sibghatullah Mojaddedi or Mujaddidi (a religious leader) serving from 28 April to 28 June 1992. Jamiat's leader Burhanuddin Rabbani would then succeed him as interim President until 28 October, and also in 1992 a national shura was to ratify a provisional constitution and choose an interim government for eighteen months, followed by elections. In these Peshawar Accords, Ahmad Shah Massoud was appointed as interim minister of defense for the Mujaddidi government.

By 27 April 1992, Hekmatyar's Hezb-e Islami Gulbuddin forces had been pushed south outside Kabul, but new mujahideen groups entered Kabul (Ittehad-e Islami, Hezb-i Wahdat, Harakat), rivalling Jamiat and Junbish, all dividing among them the city which was still largely undamaged. The interim Mujaddidi government was paralyzed right from the beginning which was 28 April 1992, due to rivalling groups contending for total power over Kabul and Afghanistan.

Aftermath 

The rest of April, and May–June 1992, civil war flared up over the control of Kabul, between at least five armies, most of them mujahideen (Islamic resistance parties), most of them sponsored by foreign states or intelligence agency: Hezb-e Islami Gulbuddin, Jamiat-e Islami, Junbish-i Milli, Ittehad-e Islami and Hezb-i Wahdat. By the end of 1992, thousands had been killed, half a million residents had fled Kabul, the town badly damaged. Groups would form alliances and break them, peace accords were attempted and failed. War expanded over all Afghanistan. In November 1994, a new Islamic-inspired group and army, the Taliban, entered the scene. They gradually gained the upper hand, and in September 1996 conquered Kabul. The only group that was left to oppose the Taliban, was Jamiat-e Islami, who was involved in a conflict with the Taliban between 1996–2001. They defended from the north-east of the country and the Taliban were never able to control all of Afghanistan.

The Taliban ruled most of Afghanistan until October 2001 when they were dethroned by a coalition of the United States of America with the Northern Alliance consisting of Jamiat-e Islami, Shura-e Nazar, Junbish-i Milli, the Eastern Shura, Harakat-e Islami and Hezb-e Wahdat. The UN and US fostered a new government led by Hamid Karzai, who was succeeded in 2014 by Ashraf Ghani. Nevertheless, by August 2021 the Taliban had retaken control of Afghanistan again and re-established their Islamic Emirate.

References

Bibliography
 
 
 Kaplan, Robert D. (2001); Soldiers of God: With Islamic Warriors in Afghanistan And Pakistan; Vintage Departures; .

External links
Afghanistan – the Squandered Victory (documentary film) by the BBC
(documentary film directly from the year 1989 explaining the beginning of the turmoil to follow)
 
Massoud's Conversation with Hekmatyar (original document of 1992)
 
Commander Massoud's Struggle (documentary film) by Nagakura Hiromi
(from 1992, one month after the collapse of the communist regime, after Hekmatyar was repelled to the southern outskirts of Kabul before he started the heavy bombardment of Kabul with the support of Pakistan)
 
 

1989
20th century in Afghanistan
1989 in Afghanistan
1990 in Afghanistan
1991 in Afghanistan
1992 in Afghanistan
Cold War conflicts
Rebellions in Asia
Communism-based civil wars
Soviet–Afghan War
Warlordism
Afghan Civil War (1989-1992)
Afghan Civil War (1989-1992)
Afghan Civil War (1989-1992)
Afghan Civil War (1989-1992)
Afghanistan–Soviet Union relations
Afghanistan–Russia relations
Government of Benazir Bhutto
Conflicts in 1989
Conflicts in 1990
Conflicts in 1991
Conflicts in 1992
Proxy wars